Bringing It All Back Home – Again is an EP by American psychedelic rock band The Brian Jonestown Massacre. It was released in 1999 by record label Which?

Content 

The album's title is a play on the Bob Dylan album Bringing It All Back Home.

The song "Arkansas" is a slightly reworked cover of a Charles Manson song found on Lie: The Love & Terror Cult.

Personnel 

Until 2012, this EP was the last release to feature Matt Hollywood, who left the band following an onstage argument, footage of which can be seen in the documentary film Dig!.

Track listing
"The Way It Was" – 2:50
"Mansion in the Sky" – 2:19
"Reign On" – 4:31
"The Godspell According to A. A. Newcombe" – 3:18
"All Things Great & Small" – 3:06
"Arkansas Revisited" – 13:26

Personnel
Anton Newcombe – guitar, harmonica, vocals
Joel Gion – tambourine, maracas
Miranda Lee Richards – guitar, vocals
Matt Hollywood – bass, guitar, vocals
Jeff Levitz (credited as Jeff Levits) – guitar

Mastering
Sam McCall/Resin Recording

References

1999 EPs
The Brian Jonestown Massacre albums